Majhira Cantonment, also known historically as Bogra Cantonment, is a cantonment about 10 kilometers south of Bogura city in northern Bangladesh.

It is the 11th Infantry Division headquarters.  The Armoured Corps Center & School (ACC&S), and the Non-Commissioned Officers Academy (NCOA) of the Bangladesh Army are also located there.

See also 
 Bangladesh Armed Forces

References 

Cantonments of Bangladesh
Bogura District